British people in Pakistan consist of British people and their descendants who emigrated from the United Kingdom. A sizeable number of Britons in Pakistan are British Pakistanis, descendants of Pakistani immigrants to the UK prior to their return. The city of Mirpur in Azad Kashmir has often been dubbed as 'Little Britain' due to the majority of British Pakistanis hailing from this region, and hence maintaining great settlement connections with the city.

In 2005, there were about 47,000 British expatriates in Pakistan, by 2015, the number had increased to 79,447.

Education
Schools catering to British children:
 British Overseas School

Tourism
According to the Pakistan Ministry of Tourism, some 115,000 British citizens and dual UK-Pakistan citizens visited Pakistan between January and May 2009.

Notable people 
 Geoffrey Langlands—retired British Major, a retired teacher and educator
George Fulton - Karachi-based English journalist
Jemima Khan - British Pakistani journalist, ex-wife of Imran Khan 
David Alesworth - English artist
Misbah Rana
Mirza Tahir Hussain
Adil Omar - English-born Pakistani rapper
Hasnat Khan - British Pakistani doctor known for his affair with Princess Diana, currently working in Lahore
Alys Faiz - British-born naturalized Pakistani poet, writer, journalist, human rights activist, social worker and teacher.
Marina Khan - Daughter of English Mother and Pakistani father - A famous Pakistani Actress and Director
 Bilqis (Christobel) Taseer, mother of Punjab Governor, Salmaan Taseer
Marjorie Husain - artist and art critic based in the country between 1960s and 2019.

See also
Immigration to Pakistan

References

 
Social groups of Pakistan
Immigration to Pakistan